Kuşcenneti railway station is a railway station in Bandırma, Turkey. The station is located in south Bandırma, near the Bandırma Airport. The station is used mostly as a yard for freight cars serving the nearby Etimaden Bohrium prossesing plant. TCDD Taşımacılık operates two daily intercity trains to İzmir; the northbound 6th of September Express and the southbound 17th of September Express.

References

External links
Station timetable
TCDD Taşımacılık

Railway stations in Balıkesir Province
Bandırma